D-Ala-D-Ala dipeptidase (D-alanyl-D-alanine dipeptidase, vanX D-Ala-D-Ala dipeptidase, VanX) is an enzyme. This enzyme catalyses the following chemical reaction

 D-Ala-D-Ala + H2O   2 D-Ala

This enzyme is Zn2+-dependent.

References

External links 
 

EC 3.4.13